Sumimoto (written: 隅本) is a Japanese surname. Notable people with the surname include:

, Japanese sprint canoeist

Sumimoto (written: 澄元) is also a masculine Japanese given name. Notable people with the name include:

, Japanese samurai

Japanese-language surnames
Japanese masculine given names